Bundoora Secondary College is a public secondary school for girls and boys in years 7 to 12 located in a residential block on the corner of Balmoral Avenue and Moreton Crescent in Bundoora, a suburb of Melbourne, Australia.

History

Originally formed as  "Greenwood High School" in an area where the closest existing schools were boys-only technical colleges, the school first took students in 1971, with an approximately 2:1 ratio of female:male students. The school was built on swampy state government land between the Greenwood Primary School and the Larundel Psychiatric Hospital. After protests by the primary school children, a remaining River Red Gum was preserved by shifting the planned building approximately 3m. As the first buildings had not been completed, classes started at the adjacent Greenwood Primary School (now Bundoora Primary School).

The home-economics and the library wing (also used by School Administration at that time) were the first, and only, buildings to be built at that time, on the current site. They were then surrounded by portable classrooms. 
Once these buildings were ready it was time, for the school to move onto its own site. This occurred during 1971 and the school was officially opened.

Greenwood High School was officially opened by the Principal Adrian Callinan in 1971. In 2011 the college celebrated its 40-year anniversary.
At the time of its official opening, the school had 4 staff and about 100 students who were all in year 7. 
Adrian Callinan remained Principal from 1971 to 1975. During this period the population of the school grew to over 600 students. At the time the school was unusual in having an entirely open student-selected curricula at year 10 level, with all subjects offered as options and large time blocks available as untaught study periods. It was also marked by informality at both the student and organizational level, with all staff contributing to management and educational policy decisions at the large weekly staff meeting. Amongst other things, as the school grew, there was no enforced 'school uniform' policy for older students. The informality and student-lead educational policy was treated with some suspicion by parents and the local community, and when Adrian Callinan left, the school moved to a more structured educational and organizational policy.

In 1976 Jean Crewther became Principal, holding the position until 1982. It was Jean who had the vision for developing and building the ECA Centre (the gym and drama studio) and it was during this time that the band Pseudo Echo was formed at the school and Mandy Walker, award-winning Australian Cinematographer, was becoming interested in film media.
Jason Stacey was playing hockey for Victoria and went on to the Olympic games.

It took until 1984 for the ECA Centre building to be completed and to be officially opened. By this time Ray Gillette was the Principal of the school. Ray was Principal of Greenwood High School from 1983 until 1987.
During the years from 1971 to 1988 the school uniform was in the Australian colours of green and gold and enrolments at the school grew to over 1200 students.

In 1988 Allan Phipps became Principal and it was during his time of leadership that the uniform changed to pale blue and burgundy. The school also changed its name to Bundoora Secondary College.
In 1992 Mill Park SC was opened and this had a significant effect on the student numbers at Bundoora Secondary College and enrolment numbers began to decline. 
Allan continued in the role of Principal until the end of 1996. With 8 years as Principal, Allan Phipps is to date, the longest serving Principal of Bundoora Secondary College.

In 1997 Hans Linssen became Principal and remained at the helm until 2001. It was under Hans' leadership that the school underwent its million dollar upgrade. Most notably changes were made to the Administration building. Australian cricketer, Clinton McKay, was a student at the school during these years.

Hans was succeeded by Tony Simpson in 2001. Tony was principal until 2004 and under his leadership significant structural changes occurred at the school. Team offices were built to reflect the team structures of Omega and Phoenix and computer pods were developed to assist in rolling out computer technology across the school.

In 2005 Stephen Smith became Principal and he continued and embedded Tony's work. Steve also implemented the senior navy blue and white uniform to give an identity to the senior (years 10–12) students.

In 2009, Susan Muscat stepped into the role of Principal in an acting capacity and was consequently appointed to the principal role in July 2010. Under Sue's leadership many new programs were implemented at the school. The most significant of these programs being the adoption of the "Take Control" (TC) model of education, first implemented at Templestowe College. The TC model was implemented at the end of 2016. As a result of this new program, for the first time in a long time, the enrolments increased for 2017. In 2018 the year 7 enrolments doubled and the same is tabled to occur for 2019. Sue retired at the end of 2018.

In July 2018 Anesti Anestis was appointed as the new Principal of Bundoora Secondary College. Anesti has made a public commitment to the strength of the educational program at the school and his excitement at being able to extend the implementation of the TC program.

Curriculum
Bundoora's curriculum provides preparation for all students to gain the Victorian Certificate of Education (VCE) or the Victorian Certificate of Applied Learning (VCAL). Bundoora's curriculum is comprehensive and tailored to maximise the opportunity for each student to undertake tertiary level study or further training.

The curriculum is delivered to three cohorts – Entry (typically year 7), PACE21 (passion, achievement, choice, empowerment, 21st century skills) (typically year 8 – 11) and Graduation (typically year 12). Students at BSC are not bound by the traditional year level classes. The Entry cohort experience a common curriculum. At the conclusion of the student's Entry year they move into the PACE21 cohort where they will experience a vertical offering of subjects which creates student's choice and provides flexibility in the learning program to ensure that all students are engaged in their learning at their point of interest and challenged at their point of need. For example, students in the PACE21 cohort may undertake subjects from the traditional suite of subjects as well as from the College's Pre VCE, VCE or VCAL programs.

Graduation students will have the opportunity to be enrolled in university units. In particular Graduation students have access to two university subjects. One is in the Exercise Science stream, the other in Nursing. Both of these subjects contribute to the ATAR score, are HECs free and will provide credits towards a university degree in each of the two identified pathways. This opportunity is available only at Bundoora Secondary College.

Partnerships

Bundoora Secondary College is Victoria's first government school specialising in partnerships and pathways in the Health and Community Services training and employment sector.
 
Bundoora Secondary College has chosen to focus on the Community Services and Health Industry which is the largest local employer within the City of Banyule.

After extensive consultations with Mercy Health Hospital Trainers, ACU and La Trobe Universities, Bundoora Secondary College agreed to participate in a partnership program. This means that Bundoora Secondary is able to offer their senior students entry into the health industry via the Vocational Education and Training (VET) sector while the student is still at school and completing either the Victorian Certificate of Education (VCE) or the Victorian Certificate of Applied Learning (VCAL). The VET certificate available is at level III in Allied Health, Aged Care or Childcare, all of which will assist in a smooth transition to further study post year 12 at either University or TAFE or to employment.

•	Opportunities exist to expand this program into other skill shortage areas in health such as dental health and audiology.
The school has used locally raised funds to develop a dedicated facility to deliver some of the health programs on the school site. These include Allied Health Services and Community Services – Childcare.

See also
 List of schools in Victoria
 Victorian Certificate of Education

References 

Public high schools in Victoria (Australia)
Educational institutions established in 1971
1971 establishments in Australia
Buildings and structures in the City of Banyule